Hypericum aciferum is a rare shrublet in Hypericum sect. Adenotrias that is found only on the southwestern region of the island of Crete. The species grows among calcareous rocks at near sea level altitudes. The species grows 4-7 centimeters tall and spreads into large ground-covering mats. Its flowers are 8 millimeters in diameter and have green sepals and bright yellow petals.

References

aciferum
Flora of Crete
Plants described in 1967